Horrendous is an American death metal band from Philadelphia, Pennsylvania. The band has released four full-length studio albums to date, the most recent being Idol, released through Season of Mist on September 28, 2018.

Career
The band was formed by Damian Herring and brothers Matt and Jamie Knox in 2009, with bassist Alex Kulick joining the band in 2016. While the band's debut album The Chills displayed a relatively traditional approach to the death metal genre, the band has since moved towards a more progressive metal sound, a development and style which has been compared with that of Death.  The band's 2014 album Ecdysis and more recent albums have received critical acclaim from major publications such as Pitchfork, Decibel, Stereogum and Spin.

Members 
 Damian Herring – vocals, guitar
 Matt Knox – vocals, guitar
 Jamie Knox – drums
 Alex Kulick – bass (2016–present)

Discography 
Studio albums
 The Chills (2012)
 Ecdysis (2014)
 Anareta (2015)
 Idol (2018)

EPs and singles
 Sweet Blasphemies (2009)
 Sentenced (2016)

References 

American death metal musical groups
American progressive metal musical groups
American musical groups